Drag/Helland Church is a parish church of the Church of Norway in Hamarøy Municipality in Nordland county, Norway. It is located in the village of Drag. It is the church for the Drag/Helland parish which is part of the Ofoten prosti (deanery) in the Diocese of Sør-Hålogaland. The brown, wooden church was built in a long church style in 1972 using plans drawn up by the architect Åge Iversen. The church seats about 100 people.

Media gallery

See also
List of churches in Sør-Hålogaland

References

Hamarøy
Churches in Nordland
Wooden churches in Norway
20th-century Church of Norway church buildings
Churches completed in 1972
1972 establishments in Norway
Long churches in Norway